Colobopsis explodens (suicidal attack ants) is a species of ant which is found in Southeast Asia. It is noted for a rare combat mechanism of workers exploding in self-defense, smothering the enemy with toxic and often deadly secretion.

Defenses 

The species was formerly known informally as "yellow goo", named after the brightly colored gunk produced by its exploding worker ants.

Territory 

Gallery

See also

References

External links 

 Colobopsis explodens
 Colobopsis explodens

Colobopsis
Hymenoptera of Asia